Boissières is the name or part of the name of several communes in France:

 Boissières, in the Gard
 Boissières, in the Lot

See also
 La Boissière, in the Calvados department
 La Boissière, in the Eure department
 La Boissière, in the Hérault department
 La Boissière, in the Jura department
 La Boissière, in the Mayenne department
 La Boissière-d'Ans, in the Dordogne department
 La Boissière-de-Montaigu, in the Vendée department
 La Boissière-des-Landes, in the Vendée department
 La Boissière-du-Doré, in the Loire-Atlantique department
 La Boissière-École, in the Yvelines department
 La Boissière-en-Gâtine, in the Deux-Sèvres department
 La Boissière-sur-Èvre, in the Maine-et-Loire department